Dąbrówka  (German: Damerkow) is a village in the administrative district of Gmina Damnica, within Słupsk County, Pomeranian Voivodeship, in northern Poland.

The village has a population of 145.

See also
 History of Pomerania

References

Villages in Słupsk County